The Burkes Creek, a mostlyperennial river that is part of the Murrumbidgee catchment within the Murray–Darling basin, is located in the Riverina region of New South Wales, Australia.

Course and features 
The Burkes Creek (technically a river) rises near Turkey Springs, below  Gap, and flows generally southwest then northwest, joined by three minor tributaries before reaching its confluence with the Bullenbong Creek south of Bulgary. The Bullenbong Creek is a tributary of the Old Man Creek, which itself is a tributary of the Murrumbidgee River. The Burkes Creek descends  over its  course.

The Olympic Highway crosses Burkes Creek at The Rock.

See also 

 List of rivers of New South Wales (A-K)
 Rivers of New South Wales

References

External links
Upper Murrumbidgee Demonstration Reach  1.22MB
 

Rivers of New South Wales
Tributaries of the Murrumbidgee River
Rivers in the Riverina
City of Wagga Wagga